Civezzano (Zivezan in local dialect) is a comune (municipality) in Trentino in the northern Italian region Trentino-Alto Adige/Südtirol, located about  northeast of Trento.

Civezzano borders the following municipalities: Albiano, Trento, Fornace and Pergine Valsugana.

Demographic evolution

References

Cities and towns in Trentino-Alto Adige/Südtirol